Indoor kabaddi was contested by seven teams at the 2009 Asian Indoor Games in Hanoi, Vietnam from 2 November to 6 November. The competition took place at the Cầu Giấy Gymnasium.

India won the gold medal after beating Iran in the final.

Medalists

Results

Round 1

Group A

Group B

Knockout round

Semifinals

Final

References
 Official site

2009 Asian Indoor Games events
2009
Asian